Sand Mountain is an unincorporated community in Bibb County, Alabama, United States. Sand Mountain was the home of John Timothy Morgan Weeks, a notable central Alabama photographer.

References

Unincorporated communities in Bibb County, Alabama
Unincorporated communities in Alabama